Nial Ring is a Dublin city councillor, who has served as Lord Mayor of Dublin from June 2018 to June 2019. An independent politician who was formerly a member of Fianna Fáil, he was first elected councillor for the Dublin North Inner City ward (where he is from) in 2009, and was re-elected in 2014 and 2019. He serves on the Central Area Committee, Central Area JPC, the Finance SPC, the Economic and Development SPC, the Audit Committee and the Fóchoiste Gaeilge in Dublin City Council.

He holds an honours degree in Accounting and Finance from DCU, is a Fellow of the Association of Chartered Certified Accountants, a Licentiate of the Institute of Bankers and also holds a diploma in financial law from University College Dublin.

He began his banking career with Allied Irish Banks in 1977, working in Dublin, London and in New York. From 1984 he was associate director of AIB International Financial Services.

He set up Barrick Capital Corporation in 1992, an IFSC-based subsidiary of international mining firm Barrick Gold. He was general manager there until 1995.

In the late 1990s he was head of finance at Bankgesellschaft Berlin (Ireland). He left Bankgesellschaft in 2001 and has been involved in bringing fledgeling prospecting companies to the London Stock Market up to his election as Lord Mayor of Dublin in 2018.

In June 2018, he was elected as the Lord Mayor of Dublin.

He was appointed to the board of the IDA in 1998 and served on it for 11 years.

Ring is a grandnephew of Liam Ó Rinn, who wrote the Irish-language version of "The Soldiers' Song", Ireland's national anthem.
He himself has a keen interest in Irish History, particularly the 1916 period when his grandfather and four brothers fought as part of the GPO Garrison in Easter Week 1916. He is an executive member of the 1916 Relatives Association. He also has an interest in the Irish language and is noted on the Dublin City Council website as one of the councillors who is happy to conduct business within and outside the council in the Irish Language (Gaeilge).

References

Living people
21st-century Irish politicians
Lord Mayors of Dublin
Irish bankers
Alumni of Dublin City University
Alumni of University College Dublin
People educated at O'Connell School
Year of birth missing (living people)